The Battle of Dragoslavele was a military engagement fought between Romanian forces on one side and Central Powers forces (Germany and Austria-Hungary) on the other. It was part of the Romanian Campaign of World War I. The battle resulted in a Romanian victory and the effective end of Central Powers advances in the area.

Background
The Central Powers forces in the area were represented by Curt von Morgen's I Reserve Corps, a mixed combat group with German and Austro-Hungarian units. The Romanian forces consisted in elements of the Romanian 1st Army, namely the 12th and 22nd Divisions. The 12th Division had been part of the 1st Army since the beginning of the campaign, while the 22nd Division had only recently been assigned to the 1st Army. The 1st Army was at that time commanded by General Nicolae Petala, who had replaced General Ioan Dragalina on 25 October, after the latter was wounded in action. Von Morgen had succeeded in clearing the Bran/Törzburg Pass by 12 October. However, there was a second ridge to the south of Câmpulung, meaning that the road into Wallachia would be open only when the town and the heights beyond it had been captured.

Battle
On 14 October, the Austro-Hungarian 8th Mountain Brigade of von Morgen's I Reserve Corps seized Rucăr, south of the Bran/Törzburg Pass. Marching through roadless, rugged terrain, the Austro-Hungarians caught the inexperienced Romanian 12th and 22nd Divisions by surprise, and turned their flank. On 26 October, Morgen's forces attacked violently near Dragoslavele, but were repulsed by the Romanians. On 27 October, the Romanians counter-attacked at Dragoslavele, taking 300 prisoners.

Aftermath
Von Morgen's efforts to press on faltered at Dragoslavele. Although his Corps was a tantalizing 8 miles from Câmpulung, Morgen's forces would make little further progress throughout the following month. Having retaken the initiative in this sector of the front, the Romanians pressed on their attack and - on the following day (28 October) - recaptured the village of Lerești. The village had been taken by the Central Powers a short while prior. 

Câmpulung was finally taken on 29 November, but not because the Romanian defenses faltered. Despite repeated attacks, the Germans had failed to break through the Romanian lines. However, not allowing its western flank to be enveloped, the Romanian 1st Army retreated towards the east, and the unbroken Romanian defenses had to be abandoned one by one. Ultimately, it was the advance from the west of other German troops that finally allowed Morgen's forces to occupy Câmpulung.  

Von Morgen argued that much more of the Romanian Army could have been captured if a breakthrough would have been achieved at Câmpulung. He insisted that this would have achieved "a real victory, a Cannae, a Tannenberg".

References 

Battles of the Eastern Front (World War I)
Battles of World War I involving Germany
Battles of World War I involving Romania
Battles of World War I involving Austria-Hungary
History of Muntenia
Conflicts in 1916
1916 in Romania